The China–Kyrgyzstan border is  in length and runs from the tripoint with Kazakhstan following a roughly south-west line across various mountain ridges and peaks of the Tian Shan range down to the tripoint with Tajikistan. The border divides (from north to south/east to west) Issyk-Kul Region, Naryn Region and Osh Region in Kyrgyzstan from Aksu Prefecture (to the north and east) and Kizilsu Kyrgyz Autonomous Prefecture (to the south and west) in Xinjiang Uygur Autonomous Region, China.

History

The origins of the border date from the mid-19th century, when the Russian Empire expanded into Central Asia and was able to establish its control over the Lake Zaysan region. The establishment of the border between the Russian Empire and the Qing Empire, not too different from today's Sino-Kazakh/Kyrgyz/Tajik border was provided for in the Convention of Peking of 1860; the actual border line pursuant to the convention was drawn by the Treaty of Tarbagatai (1864) and the Treaty of Uliastai (1870), leaving Lake Zaysan on the Russian side. The Qing Empire's military presence in the Irtysh basin crumbled during the Dungan revolt (1862–77). After the fall of the rebellion and the reconquest of Xinjiang by Zuo Zongtang, the border between the Russian and the Qing empires in the Ili River basin was further slightly readjusted, in Russia's favour,  by the Treaty of Saint Petersburg (1881) and a series of later protocols. In 1915 an agreement was signed more precisely delimiting the border the Ili Valley and Dzungarian Alatau region.
The southernmost section of the frontier (i.e. roughly the southern half of the modern China-Tajikistan border) remained undemarcated, owing partly to the ongoing rivalry between Britain and Russia for dominance in Central Asia known as the Great Game; eventually the two agreed that Afghanistan would remain an independent buffer state between them, with Afghanistan's Wakhan Corridor being created in 1895. China was not a party to these agreement and hence the southernmost section of the China-Russia boundary remained undefined.

When Kyrgyzstan became independent in 1991 it inherited a section of the USSR-China frontier. The two countries delimited their border in 1996. Formal demarcation was hampered by opposition to the border treaty by elements of the Kyrgyz opposition, centred on Azimbek Beknazarov, as part of a wider movement against then-President Askar Akayev culminating in the Tulip Revolution. The border agreement was finalised in 2009, with China giving up part of the Khan Tengri Peak while Kyrgyzstan ceded the Uzengi-Kush, a mountainous area located south of the Issyk Kul region.

Border crossings

 Torugart Pass (road) 
 Irkeshtam pass (road) 

Historically the Bedel Pass, further east along the Tian Shan mountains, has also been used.

Historical maps
Historical maps of the China-Kirghiz SSR border from north to south (west to east) from the International Map of the World and Operational Navigation Chart, middle & late 20th century:

See also
 Extreme points of Kyrgyzstan

Notes

References

 
border
Borders of China
Borders of Kyrgyzstan
International borders